Don't Smoke Rock is the first collaborative studio album by rapper Smoke DZA and producer Pete Rock. It was released on December 2, 2016, by Babygrande Records, Sony Music and The Orchard. The album features guest appearances from Dave East, Rick Ross, Royce da 5'9", Cam'ron, NymLo, BJ the Chicago Kid, Jadakiss, Styles P, Wale, Big K.R.I.T., Dom Kennedy, theMIND and Mac Miller.

Critical reception 
Bringing a taste of the Golden Age into 2016, Pete Rock and Smoke DZA remind listeners that solid production and thoughtful, socially relevant rhymes are timeless on their collaborative effort, Don't Smoke Rock. Employing his trademark sample style, the legendary Rock weaves jazz and soul snippets throughout each track, as DZA and a stacked roster of guests take turns with bars reminiscent of the '90s, a time when there was more to mainstream hip-hop than mumbling. The results are refreshing, nostalgic, and extremely satisfying for fans of that period. Released in the same year that saw the return of De La Soul, The LOX and A Tribe Called Quest, Don't Smoke Rock serves as another link between eras: paying respects to old-school hip-hop legacy with updated perspectives and production quality. In case their intent was unclear, DZA even introduces the LP reminiscing about a pre-gentrification "old Harlem" on "Intro" and later pining for the good old days on the creeping Cam'Ron & Nymlo track "Moving Weight, Pt. 1." Rock's samples range from dramatic strings ("Wild 100s"), haunting hypnotic loops (the monstrous Wale track "Show Off"), and booming horns (the Dave East joint "Limitless") to inspired comedic bits from Bernie Mac ("I Ain't Scared") and Chris Tucker ("Until Then"). Highlights are numerous. On "Black Superhero Car", DZA and Rick Ross trade verses over a throwback sample that sounds like early-era Pete Rock-disciple Kanye West. Royce Da 5'9" contributes to the plaintive, aptly titled piano-looper "Hold The Drums", and an all-star cast of BJ The Chicago Kid, Jadakiss, and Styles P descend upon "Milestone". The 13-track time machine does not relent or disappoint, making Don't Smoke Rock a standout for hip-hop fans in need of quality nourishment.

Track listing 
All tracks produced by Pete Rock

Personnel 

Olubowale Akintimehin - composer
Owen Biddle - bass
Big K.R.I.T. - featured artist
BJ The Chicago Kid - featured artist
Paul Bloom - keyboards
Dave Brewster - composer
Cam'Ron - featured artist
Shonka Dukurah - vocals
Alan M. Duval - photography
Dave East - featured artist
Jeremy Gerson - product manager
Dan "The Man" Humiston - mixing
Jadakiss - featured artist
Daru Jones - drums, music direction
Dom Kennedy - featured artist
Marcus Machado - guitar
Malcolm McCormick - composer, featured artist
Raul Montgomery - composer
John Spark Moriau - mastering
Eileen Moudou - violin
Brandon Newsome - percussion, vocals
Nymlo - featured artist
Pete Phillips - composer, executive producer, primary artist, producer
Marion "OJ" Ross - horn
Rick Ross - composer, featured artist
Royce Da 5'9" - featured artist
TaVon Sampson - artwork
Randy Singleton - photography
Smoke DZA - executive producer, primary artist
Styles P - featured artist
theMIND - featured artist
Aristotle Torres - art direction
Wale - featured artist
Preston West - A&R
Chuck Wilson - Executive Producer

References 

2016 albums
Pete Rock albums
Smoke DZA albums
Albums produced by Pete Rock